"Stars" is a song by Dutch singer Duncan Laurence. It was released for digital download on 21 May 2021 by Spark Records as the twelfth single from his debut studio album Small Town Boy. The song was written by Brett McLaughlin, Jordan Garfield, Wouter Hardy and Duncan Laurence.

Live performance
On 21 May 2021, Laurence premiered a pre-recorded live performance of "Stars" as an interval act during the final of the Eurovision Song Contest 2021, held in Rotterdam, the Netherlands on 22 May. He was not able to perform live due to a positive COVID-19 test two days prior.

Personnel
Credits adapted from Tidal.
 Brett McLaughlin – Composer, lyricist 
 Duncan Laurence – Composer, lyricist, associated performer, background vocalist, vocals
 Jordan Garfield – Composer, lyricist, background vocalist
 Wouter Hardy – Composer, lyricist, engineer, guitar, mixer, piano, studio personnel, synthesizer programming

Charts

References

2021 singles
2021 songs
Duncan Laurence songs
Songs written by Leland (musician)
Songs written by Duncan Laurence
Songs written by Wouter Hardy